Umberto Menti (born 6 April 1917 in Vicenza; died in 2002 in Vicenza) was an Italian professional football player and coach who played as a midfielder.

His older brother Mario Menti, younger brother Romeo Menti and nephew Luigi Menti (son of Mario) all played football professionally, with Romeo playing in the Grande Torino, representing Italy and died in the Superga air disaster. To distinguish them, Mario was known as Menti I, Umberto as Menti II, Romeo as Menti III, and Luigi as Menti IV. In some sources, Mario was ignored and Umberto and Romeo were listed as Menti I and Menti II respectively.

External links

1917 births
2002 deaths
Italian footballers
Serie A players
Serie C players
L.R. Vicenza players
Juventus F.C. players
Calcio Padova players
A.C. Milan players
S.S.C. Napoli players
Italian football managers
L.R. Vicenza managers
Association football midfielders
Sportspeople from Vicenza
Footballers from Veneto